The yellow-browed tody-flycatcher (Todirostrum chrysocrotaphum) is a species of bird in the family Tyrannidae, the tyrant flycatchers. It is found mainly in the southern Amazon Basin of Brazil, also Amazonian Colombia, Ecuador, Peru, and Bolivia; the species is recorded in Venezuela. Its natural habitats are subtropical or tropical moist lowland forests, subtropical or tropical swamps, and heavily degraded former forest.

Distribution

Southern Amazon Basin and Rio Negro

The range of the yellow-browed tody-flycatcher is mainly in the southern Amazon Basin, and in the east limited by the Amazon River; in the southeast, its range extends eastward including Ilha de Marajo and the last downstream region of only the Tocantins River, of the Araguaia-Tocantins River system. This southeast extension of the range ends in central-(northern) Maranhão state, in the Baia de Sao Marcos region at the Atlantic Ocean.

In the western Amazon Basin, it ranges into the southern regions of the northwest Basin, and is limited by the Rio Negro that extends to its upstream tributaries in south-central Colombia.

References

External links
Yellow-browed tody-flycatcher videos on the Internet Bird Collection
Photo-Very High Res--(Close-up)(shows "Yellow-brow"); Article; Article for the "Yellow-browed tody-flycatcher" pbase—"Birds of Peru"

yellow-browed tody-flycatcher
Birds of the Amazon Basin
yellow-browed tody-flycatcher
Birds of Brazil
Taxonomy articles created by Polbot